Noreascon is the name given to four Worldcons (World Science Fiction Conventions), all held in Boston, Massachusetts, United States.  The latter three were run by Massachusetts Convention Fandom, Inc.

 29th World Science Fiction Convention — Noreascon I (1971)
 38th World Science Fiction Convention — Noreascon Two (1980)
 47th World Science Fiction Convention — Noreascon 3 (1989)
 62nd World Science Fiction Convention — Noreascon 4 (2004)